The R4 41st Ave (designated the 91 B-Line during planning stages) is an express bus route with bus rapid transit elements in Metro Vancouver, British Columbia, Canada. Part of TransLink's RapidBus network, it replaced the 43 Express that travelled along 41st Avenue, a major east–west route that connects the University of British Columbia (UBC) to the SkyTrain system's Oakridge–41st Avenue station on the Canada Line and Joyce–Collingwood station on the Expo Line.

History 

Originally outlined in the 2005 Vancouver/UBC Transit Plan as the 91 B-Line, the route was planned to be operational in December 2009, replacing the 43 Express peak-only service between Joyce–Collingwood station and UBC. However, shortfalls in the 2010 TransLink budget resulted in a delay in the implementation of this route, the 95 B-Line (replacing 135 Express service on Hastings Street), and other service expansions. Nevertheless, the 43 Express was included as a main transit connection in a plan released following the opening of the Canada Line, indicating the importance of the route within the TransLink network.

On November 23, 2016, the Mayors' Council and TransLink's board of directors approved the first phase of the 10-Year Vision, which included provisions for new B-Line routes (including the 41st Avenue B-Line) which began service on January 6, 2020. On July 23, 2019, the route was officially rebranded the R4 41st Ave.

Route description 

The R4 travels mainly on 41st Avenue in Vancouver, and also along Joyce Street, Southwest Marine Drive, West 16th Avenue, and Wesbrook Mall.

 UBC Exchange – Western terminus, serving UBC's campus centre; transfer point for services to other Vancouver neighbourhoods, Richmond, Burnaby, and West Vancouver.
 Agronomy Road – Serves the southern part of UBC's campus; transfer point for services to other Vancouver neighbourhoods, Richmond, and Burnaby.
 West 16th Avenue – Serves Thunderbird Park and Wesbrook Village
 Dunbar Loop – Transfer point for 2 Downtown, 7 Nanaimo Station, 32 Downtown, 49 Metrotown Station / UBC
 Carnarvon Street – Transfer point for 2 Macdonald/Downtown, N22 Macdonald/Downtown
 East Boulevard – Serves Kerrisdale; transfer point for 16 Arbutus / 29th Avenue Station
 Granville Street – Transfer point for 10 Granville/Downtown, 480 Bridgeport Station / UBC, N10 Richmond–Brighouse Station / Downtown
 Oak Street – Transfer point for 17 Oak/Downtown
 Oakridge–41st Avenue station – Serves Oakridge and Cambie Street; transfer point for the Canada Line, 15 Cambie / Olympic Village Station, N15 Cambie/Downtown
 Main Street – Transfer point for 3 Main/Downtown
 Fraser Street – Transfer point for 8 Fraser/Downtown, N8 Fraser/Downtown
 Knight Street – Transfer point for 22 Knight/Downtown
 Victoria Drive – Transfer point for 20 Victoria/Downtown, N20 Victoria/Downtown
 Clarendon Street – Transfer point for 29 Elliott / 29th Avenue Station
 Rupert Street - Transfer point for 26 Joyce–Collingwood Station / 29th Avenue Station
 Kingsway – Transfer point for 19 Metrotown Station / Stanley Park, 27 Kootenay Loop / Joyce–Collingwood Station, N19 Downtown / Surrey Central Station
 Joyce–Collingwood station – Eastern terminus, serving the Collingwood neighbourhood; transfer point for the Expo Line and bus services to other Vancouver neighbourhoods, Burnaby, and North Vancouver

See also
R1 King George Blvd
R2 Marine Dr
R3 Lougheed Hwy
R5 Hastings St
List of bus routes in Metro Vancouver

External links

 TransLink

References

University Endowment Lands
RapidBus (TransLink)
Transport in Greater Vancouver
2020 establishments in British Columbia